NS Square is a future outdoor multi-purpose venue in the Downtown Core area of Marina Bay, Singapore, designed by local architectural firm WOHA, in collaboration with design firm, Populous. NS Square will occupy the current site of The Float@Marina Bay. It was first conceptualised in January 2020 to be a permanent replacement of the existing temporary floating platform. Construction of NS Square is planned to start in March 2023, with completion expected in end-2026. Along with a 30,000-seat grandstand, NS Square will house a National Service-themed gallery, community sports facilities and a public waterfront promenade.

References 

Multi-purpose stadiums in Singapore
Marina Bay, Singapore
Proposed buildings and structures in Singapore